Danushka Sandaruwan (born 29 September 1993) is a Sri Lankan cricketer. He made his Twenty20 debut on 10 January 2020, for Negombo Cricket Club in the 2019–20 SLC Twenty20 Tournament. He made his first-class debut for Negombo Cricket Club in the 2019–20 Premier League Tournament on 22 August 2020. He made his List A debut on 28 March 2021, for Negombo Cricket Club in the 2020–21 Major Clubs Limited Over Tournament.

References

External links
 

1993 births
Living people
Sri Lankan cricketers
Negombo Cricket Club cricketers
Place of birth missing (living people)